Giampaolo Stuani (born 1966 in Castiglione delle Stiviere, Province of Mantua) is an Italian pianist.

Biography 

He graduated in piano at the Conservatory L. Campiani of Mantua under the guidance of Nando Salardi. Pupil of Bruno Mezzena in 1985, he obtained the specialization diploma of the Accademia Musicale Pescarese summa cum laude.

Awards 

He has competed successfully in numerous national and international competitions and was awarded first prize at piano competitions such as: Scottish International (Glasgow), International Alfredo Casella (Naples), International Rina Sala Gallo (Monza), International Vincenzo Bellini (Caltanissetta), National A. Speranza (Taranto).

He also won various prizes at famous international piano competitions such as Ciani, Busoni, Viotti, Pozzoli (Italy), Bachauer, Kapell, Cleveland (in the United States), Épinal (France), Pretoria (South Africa), Hamamatsu (Giappone).

Concert activity 

Giampaolo Stuani has given numerous recitals in Italy: Auditorium Verdi (Milan), Teatro Comunale (Ferrara), Teatro Regio (Parma), Teatro Ponchielli (Cremona), Teatro Golden (Palermo), Teatro Bibiena (Mantua), Teatro delle Palme (Naples), Wigmore Hall (London), and France, Portugal, Czech Republic, Bulgaria, United States of America. He has also been invited to appear as soloist with leading orchestras, including: Baltimore Symphony Orchestra, Utah Symphony Orchestra, Prague Chamber Orchestra, Sofia State Orchestra, Orchestra del Teatro alla Scala of Milan, the EAOSS-Orchestra Sinfonica Siciliana, Orchestra Scarlatti of Naples, Osaka Philharmonic Orchestra, Royal Scottish National Orchestra, Orchestra da Camera di Mantova, Orchestra Sinfonica Nazionale della RAI.

Recordings 

Stuani has recorded for label such as Dynamic, Olympia, Fontec, OnClassical, Grand Piano, see Naxos.

References

External links
 Personal page with curriculum, reviews, photos, audio files at OnClassical

1966 births
Living people
People from Castiglione delle Stiviere
Italian classical pianists
Male classical pianists
Italian male pianists
Cleveland International Piano Competition prize-winners
21st-century classical pianists
21st-century Italian male musicians